The men's ne-waza open competition in ju-jitsu at the 2017 World Games took place on 29 July 2017 at the GEM Sports Complex in Wrocław, Poland.

Competition format
A total of 13 athletes entered the competition. They fought in elimination system.

Results

References

Ju-jitsu at the 2017 World Games